Paraplanodes is a genus of longhorn beetles of the subfamily Lamiinae, containing the following species:

 Paraplanodes granulocostatus Heller, 1923
 Paraplanodes simplicornis Heller, 1921

References

Mesosini